The Christmas Shoes is a 2002 American-Canadian made-for-television drama film based on the song and novel of the same name which was broadcast on CBS on December 1, 2002. It was shot in Halifax, Nova Scotia. It is the first part in a trilogy of films, followed by The Christmas Blessing (2005) and The Christmas Hope (2009).

Plot
The film has several intertwined plot lines:  Workaholic lawyer Robert Layton and the impact of his job on his marriage to Kate and his relationship with his daughter Lily.  Maggie Andrews, her terminal illness, her husband Jack and young son Nathan.  Robert's mother Ellen, and her friendly neighbor Dalton a teacher at Nathan and Lily's school.

Summary
The story opens with Robert (Rob Lowe) visiting the cemetery before Christmas. He sees a younger man wearing a Boston Red Sox Cap visiting a grave. We flash back...

Robert sees a pair of red shoes has fallen out of a delivery truck. Robert returns the shoes to Tom Wilson's (Jeremy Akerman) store.  Robert's car won't start, Tom tells him about Jack's (Hugh Thompson) repair shop. Jack's wife Maggie (Kimberly Williams) has congestive heart failure and needs a transplant. Kate (Maria del Mar) takes over Maggie's volunteer job directing the local Christmas school choir.

Nathan (Max Morrow) overhears Maggie telling Kate that she and Jack would go dancing on their anniversary.  Nathan goes to Wilson's store and finds the red shoes Robert returned. Nathan saves money to buy the shoes by collecting empty cans. Dalton (Dorian Harewood) cares for Nathan after school.  Dalton's neighbor Ellen (Shirley Douglas), gives Nathan her son Robert's old Red Sox Cap. Ellen writes a note and puts it in Robert's old lunch box.

Maggie does not receive a heart transplant.  Ellen sees Dalton loading bags of cans into his car. Ellen says she is going to leave the Christmas lights on for a while.  When the lights are still on the next morning Dalton discovers that Ellen has died.  Dalton tells Nathan that his wife died 11 years ago. He tells Nathan to cross over to an alley and Nathan finds the cans.

Christmas Eve, Nathan runs to Wilson's Department Store and Robert is late going to Wilson's. They get the store clerk to open the door. Nathan wants to buy the shoes but the clerk tells him he does not have enough money.  Seeing that Nathan is upset, Nathan explains that he wants the shoes for his mom, so that she will be beautiful in heaven. Robert pays for the shoes.  Nathan runs home.

Robert leaves the store without the gifts.  Robert's car won't start and asks Tom for a ride. Tom asks Robert if he is going to the Christmas concert.  Nathan gives Maggie the shoes. Robert and Tom arrive at the new location for the Christmas concert and meet Kate and Lily (Amber Marshall).  They are caroling for Maggie. Robert and Kate reconcile.  The family sees the light go off in Maggie's room. Robert sees the package his mom Ellen had sent, and reads the note inside.

We flash forward to present time at the cemetery. Robert tells the younger man that he likes his Boston Red Sox Cap. After the younger man leaves, Robert sees the red shoes on the grave. He realizes it is Nathan and calls after him, but Nathan has driven off. Robert smiles.

Cast

See also 
 List of Christmas films

References

External links
 
 Official CBS.com movie page

2002 television films
2002 films
2000s Christmas drama films
Canadian television films
English-language Canadian films
Films based on American novels
American Christmas drama films
Canadian Christmas films
Christmas television films
CBS network films
Films shot in Halifax, Nova Scotia
Films based on songs
Films directed by Andy Wolk
Films based on adaptations
2000s American films
2000s Canadian films